"Hunter" is a song by Swedish electronic music duo Galantis, released on May 5, 2017, via Atlantic Recording in the United States and WEA International elsewhere around the globe. It was written by Josh Wilkinson, Hannah Wilson, Ki Fitzgerald, Henrik Jonback, Jimmy Koitzsch and Galantis, with production handled by the latter three.

Background 
Galantis celebrated the release of "Hunter" with a Facebook Live event, in which they acknowledged their fans and answered questions submitted by viewers. “Hunter” was played in the background throughout the segment.

The duo appeared on Last Call with Carson Daly in May 2017 to perform "Hunter", as well as "No Money" and "Peanut Butter Jelly".

Music video
The music video, which was directed by Ben Fee, premiered on the duo's Vevo account on 29 June 2017. The video features Galantis' mascot, the Seafox, accompanied by a host of ornately dressed forest creatures on the hunt for a magical remedy.

Track listing

Credits and personnel
Credits adapted from Tidal.
 Galantis – composing, producing, mixing, programming, arranging
 Ki Fitzgerald – composing, co-producing, programming
 Henrik Jonback – composing, producing, arranging
 Josh Wilkinson – composing, co-producing, programming
 Jimmy Koitzsch – composing, producing, arranging
 Hannah Wilson – composing, vocals
 Cass Irvine – mastering engineering
 Niklas Flyckt – mixing

Charts

Weekly charts

Year-end charts

Certifications

Release history

References 

2017 songs
2017 singles
Atlantic Records singles
Warner Music Group singles
Galantis songs
Songs written by Christian Karlsson (DJ)
Songs written by Henrik Jonback
Songs written by Style of Eye
Songs written by Ki Fitzgerald
Songs written by Svidden
Songs written by Hannah Wilson (songwriter)